In Greek mythology, Areia (Ancient Greek: Ἀρεία means ‘warlike’) or Aria was the Cretan nymph daughter of Cleochus. She became the mother by Apollo of Miletus.

Mythology 
When Areia gave birth to her son she hid him in a bed of smilax, Cleochus found the child there and named him Miletus after the plant.

Notes

References 

 Apollodorus, The Library with an English Translation by Sir James George Frazer, F.B.A., F.R.S. in 2 Volumes, Cambridge, MA, Harvard University Press; London, William Heinemann Ltd. 1921. . Online version at the Perseus Digital Library. Greek text available from the same website.

Nymphs
Women of Apollo
Cretan characters in Greek mythology